Alsény Camara (born 4 November 1986 in Conakry) is a Guinean former footballer, who played as a defender.

Career
Born in Conakry, Camara moved to France as a football trainee for Toulouse FC at age 17. He never appeared for Toulouse's senior side, and after a brief loan spell at Rodez, Camara transferred to LB Châteauroux in the Ligue 2, where he would play sparingly before going without a club for six months.

References

External links

1986 births
Living people
Guinean footballers
Guinea international footballers
2008 Africa Cup of Nations players
Toulouse FC players
Association football defenders
LB Châteauroux players
Vendée Poiré-sur-Vie Football players